Chongqing Library station is a station on Loop Line of Chongqing Rail Transit in Chongqing Municipality, China. It is located in the Shapingba District. The original name of the station was Fengtianlu. It opened in 2018. Until the remaining section opened in January 2021, it served as the terminus of Loop Line in Phase I.

References

Railway stations in China opened in 2018
Chongqing Rail Transit stations